The 1989 Lamar Cardinals football season was the program's final season until reinstatement in 2010. The Cardinals played their home games at the on-campus Cardinal Stadium, now named Provost Umphrey Stadium.  The program ended the season and the sport for over 20 years with a home game on November 18 against arch-rival McNeese State.  The Cardinals won the game, 22–17.

Schedule

References

Lamar
Lamar Cardinals football seasons
Lamar Cardinals football